Raja Rani is a village development committee in Dhankuta District in the Koshi Zone of eastern Nepal. At the time of the 1991 Nepal census it had a population of 2567 people living in 491 individual households.

References

Populated places in Dhankuta District